A Beautiful Soul may refer to:

 A Beautiful Soul (film), a 2012 drama film
 "A Beautiful Soul" (song), a 2014 song by Bret Michaels